Nunatta Qitornai is a separatist political party in Greenland advocating independence. It was founded in September 2017 by former Minister of Business, Labour, Trade and Foreign Affairs Vittus Qujaukitsoq, who had previously been in Siumut and who was subsequently elected in the 2018 Greenlandic parliamentary elections. In the 2021 elections the party lost its seat.

Background 
In April 2017 Vittus Qujaukitsoq was relieved from the Foreign Affairs portfolio in the Greenlandic government by Premier Kim Kielsen due to harsh criticism of the Danish handling and filed formal complaint to United Nations with demands of the environmental clean-up of former U.S. military installations across Greenland. He stepped down as Minister of Industry, Trade, Labour and Energy in May 2017. He subsequently challenged Kielsen for the chairmanship at Siumut's party conference in July 2017, and left the party after he lost the vote 19–48.

Vittus Qujaukitsoq advocates a speedy transition to Greenlandic independence, whereas Kim Kielsen and the majority in Siumut are in favour of a gradualist approach.

The party stood in the 2018 parliamentary elections with former Prime Minister Aleqa Hammond as one of its candidates, but only chairman Vittus Qujaukitsoq was elected.

In the 2021 election the party lost its only seat.

Policies 
Apart from the speedy establishment of a Greenlandic state the party advocates decentralization of the administration and the establishment of 17 municipalities based on the current population distribution.

Name 
Nunavta Qitornai (pre-1973 spelling) was the name of a patriotic and educational youth organisation founded in 1941 by the politician and poet Augo Lynge, who was a prominent advocate for close cooperation between Greenland and Denmark and the incorporation of Greenland into the Danish state; his grandchild has criticized the use of the name for a separatist party as disrespectful to the memory of Augo Lynge.

Election results

Parliament of Greenland

Parliament of Denmark

References 

Political parties in Greenland
Greenlandic nationalism
Political parties established in 2017